The White Door is a puzzle video game developed by Dutch studio Rusty Lake. It was released on Steam and iOS on January 9, 2020 and on GOG.com on April 14, 2020.

The White Door is a story about Robert Hill, who awoke in a Mental Health Facility and lost his memory. The player needs to follow the instructions to find the secret of the main character and help him restore his memory.

See also
Cube Escape

References

External links
Official website

2020 video games
Windows games
Android (operating system) games
IOS games
Puzzle video games
Video games developed in the Netherlands